The Royal Police Force of Antigua and Barbuda is the law enforcement agency for Antigua and Barbuda. The current Commissioner is Atlee Rodney. The force has 350 officers.

Law enforcement in Antigua and Barbuda is primarily carried out by the 350-strong Royal Police Force of Antigua and Barbuda. Additionally, the 185-strong Antigua and Barbuda Defence Force  may act as Military Aid to the Civil Power.

Ranks

References